Sunshine movie may refer to:

 Sunshine (2007 film), a science fiction film directed by Danny Boyle
 Sunshine (1999 film), an award-winning post World War II film directed by István Szabó
 Sunshine Daydream, a 1972 film about a Grateful Dead concert